Randolph "Andoy" Lastrilla Ranay is a Filipino director and actor.

Controversy
During the production of the series First Time on May 11, 2010, Ranay reportedly insulted actor Jake Vargas with obscene words, prompting the latter's then-manager, German Moreno to rush to the set, confronting Ranay. He eventually apologized for his actions, according to a statement from GMA Network.

Filmography

As director

Acting

References

External links
 

Living people
Year of birth missing (living people)
Place of birth missing (living people)
Filipino LGBT actors
Filipino male film actors
Filipino male television actors
Filipino television directors
Filipino film directors
ABS-CBN personalities
ABS-CBN people
GMA Network (company) people